Since 2001, when the Carousel Productions created Miss Philippines Earth and Miss Earth pageant, the Philippines won four Miss Earth crowns.

Titleholders

Note: The years 2009 and 2010 editions, the Miss Philippines Earth remained the grand title of the event, but the four other titles i.e., Miss Philippines- Air, Miss Philippines- Water, Miss Philippines- Fire, and Miss Philippines Eco-Tourism are all equal winners. The remaining five finalists in the top 10 that failed to advance in the top five are the runners up of the pageant.  It happened once again in 2017.
Note: By 2011, it reverted to its original order with Miss Air as the runner-up or 2nd place, followed by Miss Water, Miss Fire, and Miss Eco-Tourism as 3rd, 4th and 5th placings, respectively.

International placements
Color key

References

External links

Philippines
Beauty pageants in the Philippines
Lists of women in beauty pageants